Season two of Big Brother Germany ran from 16 September 2000 to 31 December 2000 and was shown on RTL Zwei.

Season summary
After the runaway success of the first season, expectations were very high for the sophomore season. Significant changes were that the producers dared to air the nominations and eviction shows on RTL and gave it the prime slot at 8.15 pm Saturday evening. Oliver Geissen and Aleks Bechtel replaced the less known Percy Hoven and Sophie Rosentreter as hosts of the show and an additional format called Family and Friends was introduced being aired one day after the last nomination–eviction on Sunday afternoon. Daily recaps remained to be aired on RTL 2 but due to the heavy number of voluntary exits and replace entries several live specials were aired during the week, often only announced to be aired on the very same day.

Another novelty was that the viewers got the chance to watch the housemates 24/7 a week on pay-TV station Single TV.

The number of original housemates was put up from 10 to 12 and the show was extended to 106 days. Also, the audience got the chance to vote for their least favorite housemate during the week of nominations, giving the person with the most votes one nomination point. Thanks to the number of applicants from season one increasing almost ten times, the cast was much more diverse than in season one which resulted in several arguments and misunderstandings between the housemates.

The most controversial character of the season was undoubtedly Christian Möllmann, who went on to become the most hated housemate after the launch show thanks to his chauvinist behaviour on his entry and in his audition tape. No wonder he was nominated by all his fellow housemates and the viewers on the first nomination; however as a reversal of fortunes he was able to turn things to this favor with accusing fellow housemate Stefanie Juhrke, a doctor, to be a bully and talking down to people. He survived his first nomination and won the second vote against Juhrke by a landside (Juhrke received 91.2% of the votes to evict). However, he eventually left the house just three days after Juhrke's departure and proved that he was not as tough as he pretended to be. Just like several contestants of season one, Möllmann recorded a single called "Es ist geil ein Arschloch zu sein" which went straight to number one on German single charts. He became a co-host of Big Brother Germany's season 5 and 6 and was the main host of an Endemol-franchised BB clone named Der Container Exklusive which was aired on pay TV only.

The relationship of Daniela and Karim caused controversy not only because both have been in a relationship with other partners outside, but also Karim's family being strict Muslims and he was even forbidden to show up naked on screen. Against all odds, Daniela and Karim remained a couple and married months after their voluntary exit which was featured on the show as well and are still together as of now.

After several unplanned exits and additional entries (first evictee Marion was voted back into the house only to walk three weeks later again), Alida Kurras was crowned the winner of the season showing similar behaviour to first season's winner John Milz; not only were both born and raised in the former GDR but also kept quiet and very friendly towards everyone in the house. Kurras recorded a single which did not result in any success and hosted several low-profile shows on German call-in station 9Live. She went on to marry the channel's director and is still daily onscreen.
She became co-host of Big Brother Germany's season 9. Next to Kurras and Möllman, runner-up Harry Schmidt and Walter Unterweger recorded singles and played roles on German TV series.

As of now,  Season 2 had the best average share with German ratings and is known for its several arguments and hot-temperatures contestants.

Housemates

Nominations table

See also
Main Article about the show

External links
Housemate pictures, Nominations and Evictions
All profiles if the housemates season 2 (German)

2000 German television seasons
02